Australia competed at the 1984 Summer Paralympics that were held in two locations -  Stoke Mandeville, United Kingdom (wheelchair athletes with spinal cord injuries) and in the Mitchel Athletic Complex and Hofstra University in Long Island, New York, United States of America (wheelchair and ambulatory athletes with cerebral palsy, amputees, and "Les Autres" (the others) conditions as well as blind and visually impaired athletes). Four months before the beginning of the 1984 summer Paralympics, the University of Illinois terminating their contract to hold the Games. Australia won 154 medals - 49 gold, 54 silver and 51 bronze medals. Australia competed in 9 sports and won medals in 6 sports. Australia finished 8th on the gold medal table and 7th on the total medal table.

Notable Australian performances were:

In Stoke Mandeville (Spinal and Cord Injury athletes): 
Australia's female shooters: Libby Kosmala won four gold medal, creating world record on each occasion, and Barbara Caspers matched her effort also winning four gold medals
 Alan Dufty won two of each gold, silver and bronze medals on the track
 Roy Fowler won two gold medals in the singles and doubles lawn bowls 
 A host of other athletes won individual gold medals including Allan Chadwick, Julie Dowling (athlete), Terry Giddy, Eric Magennis (with Roy Fowler), Michael Nugent, Jan Randles, Wayne Ryding and Peter Trotter.
 In New York: 
 The Amputee athletes were the most successful:
 In the pool, coaching provided by Peter Carroll: Helena Brunner won 5 gold medals, Gary Gudgeon won 4, Greg Hammond won 3 and Rosemary Eames won 2.
 In the track, Brett Holcombe won 3 gold medals
 Blind and Vision Impaired athletes also benefited from a national organisation to organize competitions and raise funds.
 They performed well in track and field with Mark Davies winning two gold medals, Margaret Murphy winning a silver and bronze, and both Warren Lawton and Prue-Anne Reynalds securing bronze medals. 
 Blind and Vision Impaired swimmers excelled. Medallist included Mary-Anne Wallace (gold, silver and two bronze), Kingsley Bugarin (3 silver and a bronze), Craig Blackburn (3 silver), Therese Donovan (3 silver and a bronze), and Mary-Anne Wallace (silver and two bronze medals).
 For the first time 4 Cerebral Palsy athletes and a "Les Autres" athlete attended the Paralympics :
 Robert Walden won four gold medals in the pool
 Terry Biggs won a gold medal in table tennis
 Lyn Coleman won a silver medal on the track
 The first Australia's "Les Autres" athlete, Malcom Chalmers won a gold, silver and two bronze medals in swimming.

Preparation 
The 1984 Summer Paralympics has become known as "The last minute games". These Games were originally intended to be hosted by the University of Illinois but financial problems caused the university to pull out of hosting them three months before they were set to begin, "...without doubt resulting in a setback to the disability sports movement". On short notice, Long Island and Stoke Mandeville took up the task of hosting the Games. The NWAA felt that by hosting separate games, there would be more freedom for each disability group and more services could be provided to athletes. With 1500 athletes and officials arriving from 41 different countries it was the 35 years experience of hosting national and international games that allowed the games to be put together so quickly and efficiently. The sports stadium had been built in 1969 and ten years later the Olympic village had also been built to ensure disabled athletes always had Olympic facilities when others were closed. However, a number of small problems arose throughout the initial planning phases for the games. The seating plan needed to allow the 300-seat stadium to sit 40 different countries. Organisers claimed that there were a number of minor diplomatic problems such as the Egyptian representative Admiral Latif and organisers not knowing how many of his wives and extended family were expected to come. Furthermore, the flag the USA had provided was considerably larger than all the other nations' flags and organisers had to purchase larger flags for all other countries so the size difference wouldn’t show.

With such a large number of people arriving, 43 nations worth of athletes and officials were never going to fit into the existing Olympic village. Alternate arrangements had to be made with the Japanese team sleeping in Mandeville School, the Israeli team sleeping at a local agriculture college, the American team sleeping at RAF Halton camp and hospital beds and Thame and High Wacombe also used as accommodation. Smaller national teams stayed in the homes of locals with trainers and coaches camping in the backyard.

Volunteers 
Volunteers were in abundance throughout the Games. The spinal injuries ward was worked by volunteers and St Johns Ambulances to ensure nurses could be free for games duties. Douglas Joss was released from his job on Aylesbury Council to organise local volunteers, known as Blue Banders. Police said they couldn't help with marshalling the Games and the best they could do was put a few extra motorcycles out. A volunteer badge was handed out to volunteers and it wasn't an uncommon site for people to be wearing 5 or 6 of the same badge with different years on it.

Mascot 
The mascot for the 1984 Paralympic Games was Dan D. Lion, which was designed by an art teacher Maryanne McGrath Higgins. The name was designed by Human Resources School, a special education institute for students with severe physical impairments in New York. Running shoes and jogging clothes was the main attire the mascot wore. Dan D. Lion was only the mascot for the New York Games not the Stoke Mandeville Games which did not have an official mascot.

Team

Australia sent a large team of 58 athletes in Stoke Mandeville. These athletes were managed by George Dunstan and Don Perriman with medical supervision provided by Dr John Bourke, Sister Norma Beer and physiotherapist Maggie Beven, as well as 13 additional escorts. Australia sent 66 other athletes to the International Games for Disabled in New York. The largest components of competitors were Amputees (40) and Blind and Vision Impaired (21), while Cerebral Palsy (4) and an Australian "Les Autres" athlete attended the Games for the first time.

Amputee Officials in New York - Berry Rickards (General Manager), Peter Carroll (Swim Coach/Manager), Brian Neighbour (Athletics Coach/Manager), Wayne Bradshaw (Athletics Assistant),  Dr Les Cunningham (Sport Psychologist), Mark Mannin (Media) 
Blind Officials in New York - J. Simon (General Manager), Jane Buckley (Physiotherapist)

Opening Ceremonies

New York 
Patchy showers greeted the 14000 spectators packed into the Mitchel Park stadium for the 2pm start of the New York Games opening ceremony on 19 June. New York radio personality William B. Williams introduced everyone with a welcome speech. Entertainers such as Bill Buzzeo and the Dixie Ramblers, Richie Havens, The New Image Drum and Bugle Corps, the ARC Gospel Chorus and the Square Dance Extravaganza followed the introduction speech. Four helicopters then landed in the middle of a baseball field behind Mitchel Park, which marked the arrival of President Reagan. Next followed Jiggs MacDonald, a famous sports announcer, calling the countries for the march led by Netherlands as the hosts of the 1980 Games with each country led by Boy and Girl Scouts from Nassau and Suffolk countries.

Stoke Mandeville 
Prince Charles landed on the Buckinghamshire County Council sports field via helicopter on 22 July. He was then escorted to the Stoke Mandeville stadium by Horace Poole, Chairman of the British Paraplegic Sports Society where Dr Robert Jackson made a welcome speech to the athletes on behalf of ISMGF (International Stoke Mandeville Games Federation).

Closing Ceremonies

New York 
Commander Archie Cameron, President of ICC officially closed the games with a short speech acknowledging the athletes and the next host nation, Seoul, South Korea. The flags of the games were then lowered and American athletes carried the flags back to the reviewing stand where they were handed over the President of the Games, Dr William T. Callahan. Callahan then handed them over to the next President of the Seoul delegation, Mr Gee Woo Lee. Farewell addresses and a spiritual message then followed plus a complete black where everyone in the stadium held a light stick under a large firework display.

Stoke Mandeville 
The ceremony began with a parade of up to six athletes and their team manager entering the stadium behind a placard bearing their country's name. Presentation of medals to the successful basketball teams were next which was then followed by the presentation of the first ever Sir Ludwig Gutmann Awards which are presented to an athlete and administrator for outstanding contribution to sport for the spinally paralysed. Acknowledgment speeches then followed and the Games flag was taken to the podium where it was handed over to a representative from Korea as next host nation for the 1988 Games.

Results

Spinal and Cord Injury Australia's team won 19 gold medals in Stoke Mandeville and over half of the athletes at the VII World Wheelchair secured medals. If we combine both the International Games for the disabled in New York and the VII World Wheelchair Games at Stoke Mandeville, as the New York/Stoke Mandeville 1984 Paralympic Games, Australia had he most successful Paralympic Games since Tel Aviv 1968. The combined team won 49 gold medals, 54 silver medals and 51 bronze medals to finish eight on the medal tally.

Stoke Mandeville Australian Athlete Participation Reports 
Source:

Australia World Record Holders 
Source:

Women

Men

Medalists

|  style="text-align:left; width:78%; vertical-align:top;"|

|  style="text-align:left; width:22%; vertical-align:top;"|

Events

Archery

Australia represented by: 
Men – Stephen Austen, David Higgins, Eric Klein, Russell Schinn, Ian Trewhella 
Women – Susan Davies 
Australia won 3 medals - 2 silver medals and 1 bronze medal.

Athletics

Australia represented by: 
Men – Terry Biggs, Paul Bird, Kim Bley, Murray Buck, Bailey Compton, Paul Croft, Donald Dann, Mark Davies,  Michael Desanto, Neil Dixon, Alan Dufty, Joe Egan, David Evans, Vernon Ezzy, John Federico, Ian Gainey, Terry Giddy, Nicky Gleeson, David Goodman, James Hoggan,  Brett Holcombe, Peter Kirby, Warren Lawton, Peter Marsh, Kerrod McGregor, Robert McIntyre,  Jeff McNeil, David McPherson, Michael Morley,  Stephen Muir,  Panayiotis (Peter) Negropontis, Michael Nugent,  John Payne, Michael Quinn,  David Regan,  Stephen Sargolia, John Sheil, Darryl Smith, Peter Trotter,  Robert Turner, Jeff Wiseman, Garry Woolgar 
Women – Lynette Coleman, Julie Dowling (athlete), Meredith Jones, Margaret Murphy, Jan Randles, Prue-Anne Reynalds,  Amanda Rose, Julie Russell, Donna Smith, Catherine Watson, Valerie Woodbridge 
Australia won 58 medals - 17 gold, 19 silver and 22 bronze medals.
Coaches - D. Reed (blind), D. Regan (blind)
Officials - R. Carlton (Manager - Blind), B. Dunk (blind), L. O'Brien (blind), _

Goalball
Men - Theo Bottom, Graham Coulton, Martin Furness, Nick Gleeson, Greg Scott, Leigh Sloan 
Coach - S. Bennett   Officials - M. Downey

Lawn Bowls

Australia represented by: 
Men – David Boldery, John Forsberg, Roy Fowler, Wayne Lewis, Eric Magennis, Ken Moran, John Newton, Clifford Swann, Robert Wedderburn, Keith Zotti 
Australia won 8 medals - 2 gold, 3 silver and 3 bronze medals. Roy Fowler won 2 gold medals.

Shooting

Australia represented by: 
Men – Troy Andrews, Kevin Bawden, Keith Bremner, Allan Chadwick, Peter Parker, Andrew Rambow, Stanley Sims, Grant Walker 
Women – Barbara Caspers, Elizabeth Kosmala 
Australian team won 9 gold medals - Barbara Caspers and Elizabeth Kosmala both won 4 gold medals and Allan Chadwick one gold medal.

Snooker

Australia represented by: 
Men - Don Campbell

Swimming

Australia represented by: 
Men – Paul Bird,  Craig Blackburn,  Kingsley Bugarin,  Malcom Chalmers,  Geoffrey Fowler,  David Griffin,  Gary Gudgeon,  Greg Hammond,  Michael Kelly,  Alan Morley,  Michael Quinn, Wayne Ryding, Robert Staddon, Phillip Tracey, Robert Walden 
Women – Helena Brunner,  Lynette Coleman,  Kerri-Anne Connor,  Anne Currie,  Therese Donovan,  Rosemary Eames,  Kerrie Engel,  Meredith Evans,  Deborah Holland,  Ursula King,  Tracey Lewis,  Jan Miller,  Mary-Anne Wallace, Carol Young 
Coaches - G. Brown (Blind)
Officials - J. Blackburn (Manager - Blind)
Swimming was Australia's most successful sport at the combined Games winning 74 medals - 20 gold, 30 silver and 24 bronze.

Table Tennis

Australia represented by: 
Men – Terry Biggs, Paul Croft, Garry Croker, Joe Marlow, Errol Smith 
Women – Carmel Williams 

Australian won a gold medal through Terry Biggs performance.

Weightlifting

Australia represented by:

Men – Brian McNicholl 
Australia did not win a medal. Brian McNicholl came 4th in his event.

Wheelchair Basketball

Australia represented by: 
Men – Michael Callahan, Kevin Coombs, David Gould, Erich Hubel, Charlie Ikstrum, Michael McFawn, Bruno Moretti (playing coach), Nick Morozoff, Richard Oliver, Peter Peterson, Mark Pope
Australia did not win a medal.

See also
 Australia at the Paralympics
 Libby Kosmala

References 

Nations at the 1984 Summer Paralympics
1984
Paralympics